Anne Morrison Chapin (born Mary Anne Morrison and sometimes credited as Anne Morrison) was an American playwright, actress, and screenwriter.

Biography

Beginnings 
Morrison Chapin was born in Shoals, Indiana. "My family were New Englanders of English stock, with just a drop of Southern blood, but I am truly Western," she told reporters. She'd also spend time in Indianapolis, where she underwent training to go into business before she was called to the stage.

On the stage 
After studying at the American Academy of Dramatic Arts, she began working as an actress in Pittsburgh and New York City, appearing in a number of Broadway theatre productions in addition to writing her own plays. In 1920, she opened her play The Wild Westcotts; she also appeared in the play in a lead role, and traveled around the country nonstop through 1923. She continued writing and acting in plays on the East Coast through the 1920s.

Hollywood calls 
Hollywood took an interest in Morrison Chapin's writing talents, and by 1934, she had given up acting to pursue a screenwriting career. She'd write scripts in Hollywood for the next 14 years, ending her career at Metro-Goldwyn-Mayer (MGM).

Personal life 
In 1928, she married Newton Chapin; it was her second marriage. She died in 1967 in her West Hollywood home after a long illness, and was survived by a son, James.

Selected filmography 

 Dangerous Corner (1934)
 The Soldier and the Lady (1937)
 Romance in the Dark (1938)
 Listen, Darling (1938)
 Dancing on a Dime (1940)
 Sunset in Wyoming (1941)
 The Sailor Takes a Wife (1945)
 The Secret Heart (1946)
 High Barbaree (1947)
 Big City (1948)

Selected theatrical works 

 How Much Do You Love Me? (1920)
 The Wild Westcotts (1920)
 Pigs (1924)
 Wilbur (1928)
 Jonesy (1929)
 Love and Learn (1931)
 Broken Doll (1932)
 No Questions Asked (1934)

References 

1892 births
1967 deaths
People from Indiana
American women dramatists and playwrights
20th-century American actresses
American women screenwriters
American Academy of Dramatic Arts alumni
20th-century American women writers
20th-century American screenwriters